The Rochester Lilac Festival is an art, music, food and flora festival hosted annually in early May in Highland Park in Rochester, New York. Highland Park possesses a huge collection of lilacs, featuring more than 1800 bushes and over 500 different varieties.

The festival is started with a parade and frequently hosts concerts and other attractions during the week. The Highland Park arboretum can be toured free of charge and is open to all visitors. The fields surrounding the arboretum host a myriad of vendor's tents and food stands. The festival ends each year with the annual Lilac 10K road race and 5K Family Fun Run. The 10K Course is USATF certified.

History
It was noted as one of the nation's first municipal arboretums. Renowned park designer Frederick Law Olmsted was responsible for final development of Highland Park. The park's lilac collection was started by horticulturist John Dunbar in 1892 with 20 varieties, some of which were descendants of slips of native Balkan Mountain flowers that were carried to the new world by early colonists. Today, over 500 varieties of lilacs cover 22 of Highland Park's .

The inspiration for the festival dates to 1898 when 3,000 people came to the park one Sunday in May to see the lilacs. Ten years later, 25,000 people came to the first organized lilac festival. Since then the number of viewers has grown to over 500,000 and the festival is held over the course of ten days.

With the 2020 edition cancelled due to the COVID-19 pandemic, the 123rd was deferred to 2021. The schedule was adjusted from the ten day format to three weekends in 2021 and 2022, and is planned to return to its original format in 2023.

See also
 Highland Park
 Lilac Festival

References

External links

 

Festivals in Rochester, New York
History of Rochester, New York
Spring festivals
Flower festivals in the United States